Tyubeteyevo (Täwätäy) is a rural locality (a village) in Chebenlinsky Selsoviet, Alsheyevsky District, Bashkortostan, Russia. The population was 287 as of 2010. There are 2 streets.

Geography 
Tyubeteyevo is located 28 km south of Rayevsky (the district's administrative centre) by road. Chebenli is the nearest rural locality.

References 

Rural localities in Alsheyevsky District